The 1988 New York state election was held on November 8, 1988, to elect representatives to the United States Electoral College, a member of the United States Senate, and members of the United States House of Representatives, the New York State Assembly, and the New York State Senate.

Results (partial)
1988 New York state election results: State Senate, 19th District

Source: "THE ELECTIONS; New York State Senate," New York Times, 10 November 1988. The numbers are unofficial figures. The website Our Campaigns lists the final result as: Solomon 39,234 (72.80%), Cirnigliaro 14,658 (27.20%), citing the New York Red Book as its source.

References

1988
1988 New York (state) elections